The VII Corps of the Grande Armée was a French military unit that existed during the Napoleonic Wars. It was formed in 1805 and assigned to Marshal Pierre Augereau. From 1805 to 1807, Augereau led the VII Corps in the War of the Third Coalition and the War of the Fourth Coalition. It was disbanded after being nearly wiped out at the Battle of Eylau in February 1807 and its surviving troops were distributed to other corps.

In 1812, a new VII Corps composed of soldiers from Saxony was created for the invasion of Russia and General Jean Reynier took command. This formation survived to fight during the War of the Sixth Coalition, but ceased to exist after the Battle of Leipzig in October 1813 due to the defection of the Saxons. The VII Corps was recreated during the 1814 campaign in France and assigned to Marshal Nicolas Oudinot. The formation consisted of one Young Guard division and two regular divisions of Peninsular War veterans.

Order of battle

October 1806

Marshal Pierre Augereau (17,672, 36 guns)
 Chief of Staff: General of Brigade Claude Marie Joseph Pannetier
 1st Division: General of Division Jacques Desjardin (8,242, 8 guns)
 Brigade: General of Brigade Pierre Belon Lapisse
 16th Light Infantry Regiment, 1st, 2nd, 3rd, and 4th battalions
 Brigade: General of Brigade Jacques Lefranc
 14th Light Infantry Regiment, 2nd battalion
 44th Line Infantry Regiment, 1st, 2nd, and 3rd battalions
 105th Line Infantry Regiment, 1st, 2nd, and 3rd battalions
 Artillery: Two 12-pound guns, four 6-pound guns, two 6-inch howitzers
 3rd Foot Artillery Regiment, 4th company
 6th Horse Artillery Regiment, 2nd company (-)
 2nd Division: General of Division Étienne Heudelet de Bierre
 Brigade: General of Brigade François Pierre Joseph Amey
 7th Light Infantry Regiment, 1st, 2nd, and 3rd battalions
 Brigade: General of Brigade Jacques Thomas Sarrut
 24th Line Infantry Regiment, 1st, 2nd, and 3rd battalions
 63rd Line Infantry Regiment, 1st and 2nd battalions
 Brigade: unknown
 Hesse-Darmstadt Fusilier Regiment, 1st and 2nd battalions
 Nassau Infantry Regiment, 3rd battalion
 Artillery: Two 12-pound guns, four 6-pound guns, two 6-inch howitzers
 3rd Foot Artillery Regiment, 3rd company
 6th Horse Artillery Regiment, 2nd company (-)
 Cavalry Brigade: General of Brigade Antoine Jean Auguste Durosnel (1,290, 4 guns)
 7th Chasseurs-à-Cheval Regiment, 1st, 2nd, 3rd, and 4th squadrons
 20th Chasseurs-à-Cheval Regiment, 1st, 2nd, and 3rd squadrons
 6th Horse Artillery Regiment, 5th company, four 4-pound guns
 Corps Artillery: unknown commander (1,323 gunners and train)
 Four 12-pound guns, 12 8-pound guns, four 4-pound guns, four 6-inch howitzers
 1st Foot Artillery Regiment, 9th, 10th, 11th, and 12th companies
 2nd Horse Artillery Regiment, 1st and 5th companies

April 1809

Marshal François Joseph Lefebvre
 Artillery Reserve: Colonel Calonge
 Three 12-pound position batteries, 18 guns
 1st Bavarian Division: General-Leutnant Crown Prince Ludwig of Bavaria
 Brigade: General-Major Rechberg
 1st Habermann Light Battalion
 Leib Regiment (2 battalions)
 2nd Prince Royal Regiment (2 battalions)
 Brigade: General-Major Stengel
 4th Salern Regiment (2 battalions)
 8th Duc Pius Regiment (2 battalions)
 Cavalry Brigade: General-Major Zandt
 Minuzzi Dragoon Regiment (2 squadrons)
 Prince Royal Chevau-léger Regiment (4 squadrons)
 Artillery: Two 6-pound foot batteries, 6-pound horse battery, 18 guns
 2nd Bavarian Division: General-Leutnant Karl Philipp von Wrede
 Brigade: General-Major Minuzzi
 6th Laroche Light Battalion
 3rd Prince Karl Regiment (2 battalions)
 13th Regiment (2 battalions)
 Brigade: General-Major Beckers
 6th Duc Wilhelm Regiment (2 battalions)
 7th Löwenstein Regiment (2 battalions)
 Cavalry Brigade: General-Major Preysing
 König Chevau-léger Regiment (4 squadrons)
 Leiningen Chevau-léger Regiment (4 squadrons)
 Artillery: Two 6-pound foot batteries, 6-pound horse battery, 18 guns
 3rd Bavarian Division: General-Leutnant Bernhard Erasmus von Deroy
 Brigade: General-Major Siebein
 5th Buttler Light Battalion
 9th Isenburg Regiment (2 battalions)
 10th Juncker Regiment (2 battalions)
 Brigade: General-Major Vincenti
 7th Günter Light Battalion
 5th Regiment (2 battalions)
 14th Preysing Regiment (2 battalions)
 Cavalry Brigade: General-Major Seydewitz
 Taxis Dragoon Regiment (4 squadrons)
 Bubenhoven Chevau-léger Regiment (4 squadrons)
 Artillery: Two 6-pound foot batteries, 6-pound horse battery, 18 guns

August 1812

General of Division Jean Reynier (15,008 infantry in 18 battalions, 2,186 cavalry in 16 squadrons)
 Artillery: 50 guns
 21st Division (Saxon): General-Leutnant Karl Christian Erdmann von Le Coq
 1st Brigade: General-Major von Steindel
 Liebenau Grenadier Battalion (1 battalion)
 Prinz Friedrich Infantry Regiment (2 battalions)
 Prinz Clemens Infantry Regiment (2 battalions)
 2nd Brigade: General-Major von Nostitz
 Prinz Anton Infantry Regiment (2 battalions)
 1st Light Infantry Regiment (2 battalions)
 Cavalry Brigade: General-Major von Gablenz
 Prinz Clemens Uhlan Regiment (4 squadrons)
 Polenz Chevau-léger Regiment (4 squadrons)
 22nd Division (Saxon): General-Leutnant von Funck
 2nd Brigade: General-Major von Sahr
 Anger Grenadier Battalion (1 battalion)
 Spiegel Grenadier Battalion (1 battalion)
 2nd Light Infantry Regiment (2 battalions)
 1st(?) Brigade: General-Major von Klengel
 König Infantry Regiment (2 battalions)
 Niesemeuschel Infantry Regiment (1 and a half battalions)
 32nd Division (French): General of Division Pierre François Joseph Durutte
 35th Line Infantry Regiment (2 battalions)
 131st Line Infantry Regiment (3 battalions)
 132nd Line Infantry Regiment (3 battalions)
 133rd Line Infantry Regiment (1 battalion)
 Belle-Isle Infantry Regiment (3 battalions)
 Würzburg Infantry Regiment (3 battalions)

October 1813

General of Division Jean Reynier (12,837, 48 guns)
 Corps Artillery:
 One Saxon foot artillery battery (6 12-pound guns)
 One French foot artillery battery (6 12-pound guns)
 One Saxon horse artillery battery (4 guns)
 13th Division (French): General of Division Armand Charles Guilleminot
 Brigade: General of Brigade Antoine Gruyer
 1st Light Infantry Regiment (4 battalions)
 18th Light Infantry Regiment (1st and 2nd Battalions)
 7th Line Infantry Regiment (3rd Battalion)
 156th Line Infantry Regiment (1st and 2nd Battalions)
 Brigade: General of Brigade Louis-Francois, Baron Lejeune
 52nd Line Infantry Regiment (3rd Battalion)
 67th Line Infantry Regiment (3rd Battalion)
 101st Line Infantry Regiment (2nd and 3rd Battalions)
 Illyrian Infantry Regiment (2nd Battalion)
 Artillery: One foot artillery battery (6 guns)
 24th (Saxon) Division: General-Leutnant von Zeschau
 1st Brigade: Oberst von Brause
 Lecoq Light Infantry Regiment (1 battalion)
 Spiegel Grenadier Battalion Nr. 1 (1 battalion)
 Prinz Friedrich August Line Infantry Regiment (1 battalion)
 Rechten Line Infantry Regiment (1 battalion)
 Steindel Line Infantry Regiment (1 battalion)
 2nd Brigade: General-Major von Ryssel
 Sahr Light Infantry Regiment (1 battalion)
 Anger Grenadier Battalion Nr. 2 (1 battalion)
 Niesemueschel Line Infantry Regiment (1 battalion)
 Prinz Anton Line Infantry Regiment (1 battalion)
 Feldjager company
 Artillery: Two foot artillery batteries (16 guns)
 32nd Division (French): General of Division Pierre François Joseph Durutte
 Brigade: General of Brigade Marie Jean Baptiste Urbain Devaux
 35th Light Infantry Regiment (1st Battalion)
 131st Line Infantry Regiment (3rd Battalion)
 132nd Line Infantry Regiment (3rd Battalion)
 Brigade: General of Brigade Antoine Anatole Gedeon Jarry
 36th Light Infantry Regiment (4th Battalion)
 133rd Line Infantry Regiment (3rd Battalion)
 Würzburg Infantry Regiment (3rd Battalion)
 Artillery:
 One foot artillery battery (6 guns)
 One horse artillery battery (6 guns)
 27th (Saxon) Light Cavalry Brigade: Oberst von Lindenau
 Hussar Regiment (8 squadrons)
 Prinz Clemens Uhlan Regiment (5 squadrons)
 One horse artillery battery (4 guns)

Notes

References

1805 establishments in France
GAI07